The Hero Honda CBZ is a motorcycle launched in early 1999 by Hero Honda, with an original Honda 156.8cc single-cylinder engine. The styling of the bike was a scaled version of the Honda CB series.

The CBZ has an Over Square and Overhead camshaft engine with a Keihin slide type carburetor with accelerator pump. It has a larger spring operated nozzle to provide a richer fuel air mixture into the engine for better acceleration. An air injection to new emission standards, including Euro1.

CBZ
The bike was launched as Hero Honda CBZ in India. It was Powered by an Original Honda's 156.8cc.The engine was based on Honda CRF 150F and it came equipped with TPFC and self start as optional. The term TPFC Means Transient Power Fuel Control system .. This system uses a constant-choke carburetor. This Carburetor plays a major role by increasing the speed without any Power lag and Vibration jerks. The throttle valve inside the Carburetor creates the vacuum which operates a diaphragm pump, Which helps to controls the air-fuel ratio inside the engine through a tapered jet. Hero Honda CBZ is first and last bike to get TPFC Technology which gives a reasonable amount of boost by sending additional fuel into the engine when the throttle is opened but it also reduce the fuel efficiency of the motorcycle. The model went unchanged more or less for five years.  Hero Honda CBZ was available in the following colors- CANDY BLAZING RED, BLACK, CANDY TAHITIAN BLUE, SIENA GOLD METALLIC, SPARKLING SILVER METALLIC and TASMANIA GREEN METALLIC. Suggested Engine oil grade: SAE 20W 40 and Hero Honda CBZ (1999-2004) complies (BS1) emission norms Bharat stage emission standards.

Hero Honda CBZ Star 

In 2004, a new variant called CBZ Star was launched with revised graphics and addition of self start, it replaces the  Keihin Slide Carburetor with Conventional CV Carburetor which improves the fuel efficiency but hampered in pickup which is main feature of previous model CBZ, So it does not inspire CBZ enthusiastic also due to over use of graphics and significantly higher price compared to its competitors. The bike was discontinued after September 2005 and Hero Honda CBZ Star also complaints (BS1) emission norms Bharat stage emission standards

Hero Honda CBZ Xtreme 

The CBZ Star was followed after a gap of two years by the CBZ-Xtreme, which shared no engine and body parts with the CBZ, and had a new 149cc engine and five-speed gearbox, which also powers Hero Honda Achiever and Honda Unicorn with Advanced Microprocessor Ignition System which was introduced first by Hero Honda in Hero Honda Ambition 135. After 3 years it got facelift update by changing clear lens indicators, tail lamp setup and part digital instrument cluster and Hero Honda CBZ-Xtreme Complies (BS3) emission norms Bharat stage emission standards. After the separation of Hero Honda joint venture in 2010, Hero Updated next generation model by changing the bike name as Hero Xtreme in 2013.

Transient Power Fuel Control

Transient Power Fuel Control system uses its nozzle inside the carburetor to sprays petrol inside the engine. So, when the rider opens the throttle suddenly. it will give power instantly to rev the engine without any issues, nearly equal to fuel injection concept but it is powered mechanically, whereas Fuel injection is an electronic concept. This increases the throttle response crisps as like fuel injection and the engine feels lively. However, this increases the emission levels and TPFC Accidentally waste some amount of fuel, Because, the accelerator pump inject some extra amount fuel when the rider applies sudden throttle compensate for lean air-fuel mixture which it generates. Hence, TPFC was consequently discontinued. Later, the fuel injection technology replaced the carburetor, it performs the same mechanism but drastically improves the fuel efficiency, due to correct level of air-fuel mixture performed electronically instead of old Carburetor mechanism..

Related bikes
Hero Honda Ambition 135 
Hero Honda Karizma R 
Hero Honda Splendor 
Hero Honda Hunk 
Hero Passion 
Hero Pleasure 
Hero Honda Achiever 
Honda Shine 
Honda Unicorn 
Hero Honda Super Splendor 
Hero Honda Karizma 
Hero Honda Karizma ZMR
Honda Activa

References
 
 
 
 
 
 
 
 .

Related bikes
Hero Honda Ambition 135 
Hero Honda Karizma R 
Hero Splendor 
Hero Honda Hunk 
Hero Passion 
Hero Pleasure 
Hero Honda Achiever 
Honda Shine 
Honda Unicorn 
Hero Honda Super Splendor 
Hero Honda Karizma 
Hero Honda Karizma ZMR
Honda Activa

External links
 

CBZ
Motorcycles introduced in 1999